General of the People's Public Security of Vietnam is the highest rank in the Vietnam People's Public Security with the title of 4 gold stars. According to current Vietnamese law, the President is concurrently the Chairman Council for National Defense and Security conferring, promoting, demoting or stripping this rank.

Overview 
The rank of General of the People's Public Security of Vietnam was first regulated by Decree 331/TTG dated September 1, 1959, providing for the rank system of the People's Armed Police (now the Vietnam Border Guards).

List of Generals of the People's Public Security of Vietnam

References

Law enforcement in Vietnam